Monja Liseki (born 8 August 1979) is a retired Tanzanian football striker.

References

1979 births
Living people
Tanzanian footballers
Tanzania international footballers
Mtibwa Sugar F.C. players
Miembeni S.C. players
Association football forwards
Tanzanian expatriate footballers
Expatriate footballers in Yemen
Tanzanian expatriate sportspeople in Yemen
Tanzanian Premier League players